This is a list of films based on English-language comics, including comic books, graphic novels, and features in anthology comics magazines. It includes films that are adaptations of English-language comics, and those films whose characters originated in comic books (e.g. Batman is not an adaptation of one particular comic book, but the character first appeared in comic books, not in another medium). It also includes film serials. It does not include material where the original source is newspaper comic strips, which is featured on a separate list.

All films categorized by character listed chronologically.

0–9
 2 Guns (2013) (Boom Studios)
 30 Days of Night (IDW publishing):
 30 Days of Night (2007)
 30 Days of Night: Dark Days (2010, direct-to-video movie)
 300 (Dark Horse Comics):
 300 (2007)
 300: Rise of an Empire (2014)

A
 Abattoir (2016) (Radical Comics)
Adam Strange (2020, animated short film) (DC Comics)

 Agent Carter (2013, direct-to-video short film) (Marvel Comics)
 Alien vs. Predator (based on previous Alien and Predator films and the Dark Horse comics of the same name):
 Alien vs. Predator (2004)
 Aliens vs. Predator: Requiem (2007)

 The Amazing Screw-On Head (2006, animated pilot) (Dark Horse Comics)
 American Splendor (2003) (Dark Horse Comics)
 American Terror (2013, animated short film) (Alterna Comics)
 Ant-Man (Marvel Comics):
 Ant-Man (2015)
 Ant-Man and the Wasp (2018)
 Ant-Man and the Wasp: Quantumania (2023)
 Aquaman (DC Comics)
 Aquaman (2006, failed TV pilot)
 Lego DC Comics Super Heroes: Aquaman: Rage of Atlantis (2018, direct-to-video LEGO film)
 Aquaman (2018)
 Archie Comics:
 Archie: To Riverdale and Back Again (1990, TV movie)
 The Archies in Jugman (2002, animated TV movie)
 Art School Confidential (2006) (FantaGraphics)

 Avengers (Marvel Comics):
 Ultimate Avengers (2006, animated direct-to-video)
 Ultimate Avengers 2: Rise of the Panther (2006, animated direct-to-video)
 Next Avengers: Heroes of Tomorrow (2008, animated direct-to-video)
 The Avengers (2012)
 Item 47 (2012, direct-to-video short film)
 Lego Marvel Super Heroes: Maximum Overload (2013,  animated web movie)
 Avengers Confidential: Black Widow & Punisher (2014, animated direct-to-video)
 Avengers: Age of Ultron (2015)
 Lego Marvel Super Heroes: Avengers Reassembled (2015, animated TV movie)
 Marvel Super Hero Adventures: Frost Fight! (2015, animated TV special)
 Avengers: Infinity War (2018)
 Avengers: Endgame (2019)

B
 The B.P.R.D. Declassified (2004, TV special) (Dark Horse Comics)
 The Bad Guys (2022) (Australian Comic)
 Bad Kids (Antarctic Press)
 Bad Kids Go to Hell (2012)
 Bad Kids of Crestview Academy (2017)
 Barb Wire (1996) (Dark Horse Comics)
 Batman (DC Comics):
 Batman (1943, serial)
 Batman and Robin (1949, serial)
 Batman (1966)
 Batman (1989)
 Batman Returns (1992)
 Batman: Mask of the Phantasm (1993, animated)
 Batman Forever (1995)
 Batman & Robin (1997)
 Batman & Mr. Freeze: SubZero  (1998, animated direct-to-video)
Batman Beyond: The Movie (1999, animated direct-to-video)
 Batman Beyond: Return of the Joker (2000, animated direct-to-video)
 Chase Me (2003, animated short film)
 Batman: Mystery of the Batwoman (2003, animated direct-to-video)
 Batman Begins (2005)
 The Batman vs. Dracula (2005, animated direct-to-video)
 The Dark Knight (2008)
 Batman: Gotham Knight (2008, animated direct-to-video)
 Superman/Batman: Public Enemies (2009, animated direct-to-video)
 Batman: Under the Red Hood (2010, animated direct-to-video)
 Superman/Batman: Apocalypse (2010, animated direct-to-video)
 Batman: Year One (2011, animated direct-to-video)
 The Dark Knight Returns - Part 1 (2012, animated direct-to-video)
 The Dark Knight Rises (2012)
 The Dark Knight Returns - Part 2 (2013, animated direct-to-video)
 Lego Batman: The Movie – DC Super Heroes Unite (2013, animated direct-to-video)
 Son of Batman (2014, animated direct-to-video)
 Batman: Assault on Arkham (2014, animated direct-to-video)
 Lego DC Comics: Batman Be-Leaguered (2014, animated TV special)
 Batman vs. Robin (2015, animated direct-to-video)
 Batman Unlimited: Animal Instincts, (2015, animated direct-to-video)
 Batman Unlimited: Monster Mayhem (2015, animated direct-to-video)
 Batman: Bad Blood (2016, animated direct-to-video)
 Batman v Superman: Dawn of Justice (2016)
 Batman: The Killing Joke (2016, animated direct-to-video)
 Batman Unlimited: Mechs vs. Mutants (2016, animated direct-to-video)
 Batman: Return of the Caped Crusaders (2016, animated direct-to-video)
 The Lego Batman Movie (2017, animated spin-off of The Lego Movie)
 Batman and Harley Quinn (2017, animated direct-to-video)
 Batman vs. Two-Face (2017, animated direct-to-video)
 Scooby-Doo! & Batman: The Brave and the Bold (2018, animated direct-to-video)
 Batman: Gotham by Gaslight (2018, animated direct-to-video)
 Batman Ninja (2018, animated direct-to-video)
 Batman vs. Teenage Mutant Ninja Turtles (2019, animated direct-to-video)
Batman: Death in the Family (2020, animated short film)
 Batman: Hush (2019, animated direct-to-video)
Batman: Soul of the Dragon (2021, animated direct-to-video)
Batman: The Long Halloween, Part One (2021, animated direct-to-video)
Batman: The Long Halloween, Part Two (2021, animated direct-to-video) 
 The Batman (2022)
 Batman and Superman: Battle of the Super Sons (2022, animated direct-to-video)

 Big Hero 6 (2014, animated) 
 Birds of Prey (2020) (DC Comics)
 Black Adam (2022) (DC Comics)
 Rise of the Black Bat (2012, direct-to-video)
 Black Panther (Marvel Comics):
 Black Panther (2018)
 Lego Marvel Super Heroes - Black Panther: Trouble in Wakanda (2018, direct-to-video Lego film)
 Black Panther: Wakanda Forever (2022)

 Blackhawk (1952, serial) (DC Comics)
 Black Widow (2021) (Marvel Comics)
 Blade (Marvel Comics):
 Blade (1998)
 Blade II (2002)
 Blade: Trinity (2004)
Blade: House of Chthon (2007, direct-to-video)
 Bloodshot (2020) (Valiant Comics)
 The Bogie Man (1992, TV movie) (Fat Man Press)
 Bounty Killer (2013) (Kickstart Comics)

 Bulletproof Monk (2003) (Image Comics)

C
 Captain America (Marvel Comics):
 Captain America (1944, serial)
 Captain America (1979, TV movie)
 Captain America II: Death Too Soon (1979, TV movie)
 Captain America (1990)
 Captain America: The First Avenger (2011)
 Captain America: The Winter Soldier (2014)
 Iron Man & Captain America: Heroes United (2014, animated direct-to-video)
 Captain America: Civil War (2016)
 Captain Battle: Legacy War (2013) (Image Comics)
 Captain Marvel (DC Comics) (DC Comics) 
 Adventures of Captain Marvel (1941, film serial)
 Superman/Shazam!: The Return of Black Adam (2010, animated short film)
 Shazam! (2019)
Lego DC: Shazam!: Magic and Monsters (2020, animated direct-to-video)
 Captain Marvel (2019) (Marvel Comics)

 Catwoman (DC Comics)
 Catwoman (2004)
 Catwoman (2011, animated short film)
Catwoman: Hunted (2022; animated direct-to-video)

 City Cat (1992, short TV movie) (Eternity Comics)
 Chickenhare and the Hamster of Darkness (2022, animated) (Dark Horse Comics)
 The Clockwork Girl (2014, animated) (Arcana Studios)

 The Coldest City (Oni Press)
 Atomic Blonde (2017)
 Congo Bill (1948, serial) (DC Comics)
 Constantine (DC Comics)
Constantine (2005)
Constantine: City of Demons - The Movie (2018) (animated direct-to-video)
 The Consultant (2011, direct-to-video short film) (Marvel Comics)
 Corrective Measures (2022)	(Arcana Comics)
 Cowboys & Aliens (2011) (Platinum Studios)

 The Crow (Caliber Press)
 The Crow (1994)
 The Crow: City of Angels (1996)
 The Crow: Salvation (2000)
 The Crow: Wicked Prayer (2005)

D

 Daredevil (2003) (Marvel Comics)

 DC League of Super-Pets (2022) (DC Comics)
 DC Super Hero Girls (2016) (DC Comics):
 DC Super Hero Girls: Super Hero High (2016, animated TV movie)
 DC Super Hero Girls: Hero of the Year (2016, animated direct-to-video)
 DC Super Hero Girls: Intergalactic Games (2017, animated direct-to-video)
 Lego DC Super Hero Girls: Brain Drain (2017, animated direct-to-video)
 Lego DC Super Hero Girls: Super-Villain High (2018, animated direct-to-video)
 DC Super Hero Girls: Legends of Atlantis (2018, animated direct-to-video)
 DC Super Hero Girls (2019) (DC Comics)
 #TheLateBatsby (2018, animated short film)
 DC Super Hero Girls: Sweet Justice (2019, animated TV movie)
 Deadpool (Marvel Comics)
 Deadpool (2016)
 Deadpool: No Good Deed (2017, short film)
 Deadpool 2 (2018)
 Once Upon a Deadpool (2018, PG-13 cut of Deadpool 2)
 Deadpool and Korg React (2021, short film)
Death (2019, animated short film) (DC Comics)
Deathstroke: Knights & Dragons: The Movie (2020, animated direct-to-video) (DC Comics)

 The Diary of a Teenage Girl (2015) (Frog Books)

 Doctor Strange (Marvel Comics)
 Dr. Strange (1978, TV movie)
 Doctor Strange: The Sorcerer Supreme (2007, animated direct-to-video)
 Doctor Strange (2016)
 Doctor Strange in the Multiverse of Madness (2022)
 Dracula: Sovereign of The Damned (1980, anime TV movie)(Marvel Comics)

E
 Elektra (2005) (Marvel Comics)

 The Empty Man (2020) (Boom! Studios)
 Eternals (2021) (Marvel Comics)
 Ethel & Ernest (2016, animated film) (Jonathan Cape - British Publisher)
 Extraction (2020) (Oni Press)

F
 Fantastic Four (Marvel Comics)
 The Fantastic Four (1994, unreleased)
 Fantastic Four (2005)
 Fantastic Four: Rise of the Silver Surfer (2007)
 Fantastic Four (2015, reboot)
 Faust: Love Of The Damned (2000) (Avatar Press)
 Firearm (1993, direct-to-video short) (Malibu Comics)
 Firebreather (2010, animated TV movie) (Image Comics)
 The Flash (DC Comics):
 The Flash (1990, TV Movie)
 The Flash II: Revenge of the Trickster (1991, TV movie)
 The Flash III: Deadly Nightshade (1992, TV movie)
 Lego DC Comics Super Heroes: The Flash (2018, animated direct-to-video film)
Freedom Fighters: The Ray (2018, animated direct-to-video) (DC Comics)

 From Hell (2001) (Top Shelf Productions)

G
 G-Men from Hell (2000) (Dark Horse Comics)

 Gen¹³ (2000, animated) (Wildstorm)
 Generation X (1996, TV movie) (Marvel Comics)
 Ghost Rider (Marvel Comics):
 Ghost Rider (2007)
 Ghost Rider: Spirit of Vengeance (2012)

 Ghost World (2001) (Fantagrapics)

 Global Frequency (2005, unaired pilot) (Wildstorm)
 Green Arrow (DC Comics):
 Green Arrow (2010, animated short film) 

 Green Lantern (DC Comics):
 Green Lantern: First Flight (2009, animated direct-to-video)
 Green Lantern: Emerald Knights (2011, animated direct-to-video)
 Green Lantern (2011)
 Guardians of the Galaxy (Marvel Comics):
 Guardians of the Galaxy (2014)
 Guardians of the Galaxy Vol. 2 (2017)
 Lego Marvel Super Heroes - Guardians of the Galaxy: The Thanos Threat (2017, animated Lego TV film)

H

 Hardware (1990, unauthorized by Fleetway Publications)
 The Haunted World of El Superbeasto (2009, animated) (MVCreations)
 Heavy Metal(HM Communication):
 Heavy Metal (1981, animated)
 Heavy Metal 2000 (2000, animated)
 Hellboy (Dark Horse Comics):
 Hellboy (2004)
 Hellboy: Sword of Storms (2006, animated TV movie)
 Hellboy: Blood and Iron (2007, animated TV movie)
 Hellboy II: The Golden Army (2008)
 Hellboy (2019)

 Hercules (2014) (Radical Comics) 

 Hilda and the Mountain King (2021, animated)(Nobrow Press)
 A History of Violence (2005) (Paradox Press)
 Hop Harrigan (1946, serial) (DC Comics)
 Howard the Duck (1986) (Marvel Comics)
 Howard Lovecraft (Arcana Comics): 
 Howard Lovecraft and the Frozen Kingdom (2016, animated direct-to-video)
 Howard Lovecraft and the Undersea Kingdom (2017, animated direct-to-video)
 Howard Lovecraft and the Kingdom of Madness (2018, animated direct-to-video)
 Hulk (Marvel Comics):
 The Incredible Hulk (1977)
Return of the Incredible Hulk (1977)
The Incredible Hulk: Married (1978, TV movie)
The Incredible Hulk Returns (1988)
 The Trial of the Incredible Hulk (1989)
 The Death of the Incredible Hulk (1990)
 Hulk (2003)
 The Incredible Hulk (2008)
 Hulk Versus (2008, animated direct-to-video)
 Planet Hulk (2010, animated direct-to-video)
 Iron Man & Hulk: Heroes United (2013, animated direct-to-video)
 Hulk: Where Monsters Dwell (2016, animated direct-to-video)

I
 I Kill Giants (2018) (Image Comics)
 I, Frankenstein (2014) (Darkstorm Comics) 
Inhumans: The First Chapter (2017) (Marvel Comics)
Injustice (2021, animated direct-to-video) (DC Comics)

 Invasion (2016, Arrowverse crossover event) (DC Comics)
 Iron Man (Marvel Comics)
 The Invincible Iron Man (2007, animated direct-to-video)
 Iron Man (2008)
 Iron Man 2 (2010)
 Iron Man 3 (2013)
 Iron Man: Rise of Technovore (2013, anime direct-to-video)
 Iron Man & Hulk: Heroes United (2013, animated direct-to-video)
 All Hail the King (2014, direct-to-video short film)
 Iron Man & Captain America: Heroes United (2014, animated direct-to-video)

J
 Jiu Jitsu (2020) (Acme Rocket Fuel)
 Joker (2019) (DC Comics)
 Jonah Hex (DC Comics)
 Jonah Hex (2010)
 Jonah Hex (2010, animated short film)
 Josie and the Pussycats (2001) (Archie Comics)
 Judge Dredd (Fleetway Publications):
 Judge Dredd (1995)
 Dredd (2012)
 Justice League (DC Comics)
 Legends of the Superheroes (1979, TV specials)
 Justice League of America (1997, unsuccessful pilot)
Justice League: Secret Origins (2001, animated direct-to-video)
Justice League: Starcrossed (2004, animated direct-to-video)
 Justice League: The New Frontier (2008, animated direct-to-video)
 Justice League: Crisis on Two Earths (2010, animated direct-to-video)
 Justice League: Doom (2012, animated direct-to-video)
 Robot Chicken DC Comics Special (2012, animated TV special)
 Justice League: The Flashpoint Paradox (2013, animated direct-to-video)
 JLA Adventures: Trapped in Time (2014, animated direct-to-video)
 Justice League: War (2014, animated direct-to-video)
 Robot Chicken DC Comics Special 2: Villains in Paradise (2014, animated TV special)
 Justice League: Throne of Atlantis (2015, animated direct-to-video)
 Lego DC Comics Super Heroes: Justice League vs. Bizarro League (2015, animated direct-to-video)
 Justice League: Gods and Monsters (2015, animated direct-to-video)
 Lego DC Comics Super Heroes: Justice League – Attack of the Legion of Doom (2015, animated direct-to-video)
 Robot Chicken DC Comics Special III: Magical Friendship (2015, animated TV special)
 Lego DC Comics Super Heroes: Justice League – Cosmic Clash (2016, animated direct-to-video)
 Justice League vs. Teen Titans (2016, animated direct-to-video)
 Lego DC Comics Super Heroes: Justice League – Gotham City Breakout (2016, animated direct-to-video)
Justice League Dark (2017, animated direct-to-video)
DC Super Heroes vs. Eagle Talon (2017, animated)
 Justice League (2017)
 Justice League vs. the Fatal Five (2019, animated direct-to-video)
 Justice League Dark: Apokolips War (2020, animated direct-to-video)
 Zack Snyder's Justice League (2021)
Justice Society: World War II (2021, animated direct-to-video) (DC comics)

K
 Kick-Ass (Icon Comics)
 Kick-Ass (2010)
 Kick-Ass 2 (2013)
 Kingsman (Icon Comics)
 Kingsman: The Secret Service (2015)
 #TBT to That Time Archer Met Kingsman (2017, animated short, crossover with the non-comic book TV series Archer)
 Kingsman: The Golden Circle (2017)
 The King's Man (2021)
 The Kitchen (2019) (Vertigo Comics)
 Knights of Justice (2000, TV movie) (Caliber Comics)
 Kyoufu Densetsu Kaiki! Frankenstein (1981, anime TV movie) (Marvel Comics)

L
 Lady Death: The Movie (2004, animated) (Chaos! Comics)
 The Last Days of American Crime (2020) (Radical Comics)
 The League of Extraordinary Gentlemen (2003) (WildStorm)

 The Lobo Paramilitary Christmas Special (2002, fan film) (DC Comics)
 Locke & Key (IDW Publishing)
 Locke & Key (2011, TV pilot)

 The Losers (2010) (Vertigo Comics)

M
 M. Rex (Avalon Comics)
 Ben 10/Generator Rex: Heroes United (2011, animated TV movie, crossover with the non-comic book franchise Ben 10)

 Man-Thing (2005, TV movie) (Marvel Comics):
 Marry Me (2022) (Keenspot)
Marvel Rising (Marvel Comics):
Marvel Rising: Secret Warriors (2018, animated TV movie)
Marvel Rising: Chasing Ghosts (2019, animated direct-to-video short film)
Marvel Rising: Heart of Iron (2019, animated direct-to-video short film)
Marvel Rising: Battle of the Bands (2019, animated direct-to-video short film)
Marvel Rising: Operation Shuri (2019, animated direct-to-video short film)
Marvel Rising: Playing with Fire (2019, animated direct-to-video short film)

 Marvel Super Heroes 4D (2010, animated short film) (Marvel Comics)
 The Mask (Dark Horse Comics)
 The Mask (1994)
 Son of the Mask (2005)

 The Men in Black (Malibu Comics)
 Men in Black (1997)
 Men in Black II (2002)
 Men in Black 3 (2012)
 Men in Black: International (2019)

 Monkeybone (2001) (Mad Monkey Press)
 Morbius (2022) (Marvel Comics)
 Mosaic (2007, animated direct-to-video) (POW! Entertainment)
 El Muerto (2005) (Los Comex)
 My Friend Dahmer (2017) (Abrams ComicArts)

 Mystery Men (1999)(Dark Horse Comics)

N
 The New Mutants (2020) (Marvel Comics)
 Nick Fury: Agent of S.H.I.E.L.D. (1998, TV movie) (Marvel Comics)
 Nightveil: Witch War (2005, direct-to-video) (AC Comics)
 Nightwing and Robin (2015, animated short film) (DC Comics)

O
 Oblivion (2013) (Radical Publishing)
 Officer Downe (2016) (Image Comics)
 The Old Guard (2020) (Image Comics)

P
 Painkiller Jane (2005, TV movie) (Icon Comics)
 Paradox (2010, TV movie) (Arcana)
The Phantom Stranger (2020, animated short film) (DC Comics) 
 Paris, 13th District (2021) (Drawn and Quarterly)

 Pixies (2015, animated) (Arcana)
 Plastic Man (2006, unaired animated pilot) (DC Comics)
 Polar (2019) (Dark Horse Comics)
 Power Pack (1991, TV pilot) (Marvel Comics)

 Punisher (Marvel Comics)
 The Punisher (1989)
 The Punisher (2004)
 Punisher: War Zone (2008)
 The Punisher: Dirty Laundry (2012, fan film)
 Punisher: Do Not Fall in New York City (2012, fan film)
 Avengers Confidential: Black Widow & Punisher (2014, animated direct-to-video)

Q

R
 Random Acts of Violence (2019) (Image Comics)
 R.I.P.D. (Dark Horse Comics)
 R.I.P.D. (2013)
 R.I.P.D. 2: Rise of the Damned (2022)

 RED (WildStorm)
 Red (2010)
 Red 2 (2013)
 Red Sonja (Dynamite Entertainment)
 Red Sonja (1985)
 Red Sonja: Queen of Plagues (2016, animated direct-to-video)
 Remains (2011, TV movie) (IDW Publishing)

 Richie Rich (Harvey Comics)
 Ri¢hie Ri¢h (1994)
 Richie Rich's Christmas Wish (1998, direct-to-video movie)
 Road to Perdition (2002) (Paradox Press)

 The Rocketeer (1991) (Pacific Comics)

 Rottentail (2019) (Point Press)
 Rumble (2021) (Top Shelf Productions)

S
 Sabrina the Teenage Witch (Archie Comics)
 Sabrina the Teenage Witch (1996, TV movie)
 Sabrina Goes to Rome (1998, TV movie)
 Sabrina Down Under (1999, TV movie)
 Sabrina: Friends Forever (2002, animated TV movie)

 The Scarab (Nedor Comics):
 Avenging Force: The Scarab (2012, direct-to-video) 

 Scalped (2017, unaired pilot) (DC Comics/Vertigo)
 Samaritan (2022) (Mythos Comics)
 Scott Pilgrim (Oni Press):
 Scott Pilgrim vs. the World (2010)
 Scott Pilgrim vs. The Animation (2010, animated TV special)
 The Scribbler (2014) (Image Comics)
Sgt. Rock (2019, animated direct-to-video short film) (DC Comics)

 Shang-Chi and the Legend of the Ten Rings (2021) (Marvel Comics)
 Sheena (1984) (Fiction House)
 Shockwave, Darkside (2014) (Keenspot)

 Sin City (Dark Horse Comics):
 Sin City (2005)
 Sin City: A Dame to Kill For (2014)
 The Sixth Gun (2013, TV pilot) (Oni Press)
 Solarman (1992, animated pilot) (Marvel Comics)
 Spawn (1997) (Image Comics)
 The Spectre (2010, animated direct-to video short film) (DC Comics)
 Spider-Man (Marvel Comics):
 Spider-Man (1977, TV movie)
 Spider-Man Strikes Back (1978, TV movie)
Spider-Man (1978, short film)
 Spider-Man: The Dragon's Challenge (1981, TV movie)
 Spider-Man (2002)
 Spider-Man 2 (2004)
 Spider-Man 3 (2007)
 The Amazing Spider-Man (2012, reboot)
 The Amazing Spider-Man 2 (2014)
 Spider-Man: Homecoming (2017, MCU series)
 Spider-Man: Into the Spider-Verse (2018, animated)
Spider-Ham: Caught in a Ham (2019, animated short film)
 Spider-Man: Far From Home (2019, MCU series)
Peter's To-Do List (2019, direct-to-video short film, MCU series)
Spider-Man: No Way Home (2021, MCU series)
 The Spirit: (Eisner & Iger)
 The Spirit (1987, TV movie)
 The Spirit (2008)

 SpongeBob (The Intertidal Zone)
 The SpongeBob SquarePants Movie (2004)
 The SpongeBob Movie: Sponge Out of Water (2015)
 The SpongeBob Movie: Sponge on the Run (2021)
 Spy Smasher (1942, serial) (DC Comics)
 Stan Lee's Mighty 7: Beginnings (2014, animated TV movie) (POW! Entertainment)
 Steel (1997) (DC Comics)

 Stitched (2011, short film) (Avatar Film)

 Suicide Squad (DC Comics):
 Suicide Squad (2016)
 Suicide Squad: Hell to Pay (2018, animated direct-to-video)
 The Suicide Squad (2021)

 Supergirl (1984) (DC Comics)
 Superman (DC Comics):
 Superman (1948, serial)
 Atom Man vs. Superman (1950, serial)
 Superman and the Mole Men (1951)
 It's a Bird...It's a Plane...It's Superman (1975, TV special)
 Superman (1978)
 Superman II (1980)
 Superman II: The Richard Donner Cut (2006, direct-to-video)
 Superman III (1983)
 Superman IV: The Quest for Peace (1987)
Superman: The Last Son of Krypton (1996, animated direct-to-video)
The Batman Superman Movie: World's Finest (1999, animated direct-to-video)
 Superman Returns (2006)
 Superman: Brainiac Attacks (2006, animated direct-to-video)
 Superman: Doomsday (2007, animated direct-to-video)
 Superman/Batman: Public Enemies (2009, animated direct-to-video)
 Superman/Batman: Apocalypse (2010, animated direct-to-video)
 Superman/Shazam!: The Return of Black Adam (2010, animated short film)
 All-Star Superman (2011, animated direct-to-video)
 Superman vs. The Elite (2012, animated direct-to-video)
 Superman: Unbound (2013, animated direct-to-video)
 Man of Steel (2013)
 Batman v Superman: Dawn of Justice (2016)
 The Death of Superman (2018, animated direct-to-video)
 Reign of the Supermen (2019, animated direct-to-video)
 Superman: Red Son (2020, animated direct-to-video)
 Superman: Man of Tomorrow (2020, animated direct-to-video)
 Batman and Superman: Battle of the Super Sons (2022, animated direct-to-video)

 Surrogates (2009) (Top Shelf Productions)
 Swamp Thing (DC Comics/Vertigo):
 Swamp Thing (1982)
 The Return of Swamp Thing (1989)

T
 Tales from the Crypt (EC Comics):
 Tales from the Crypt (1972) 
 Tales from the Crypt: Demon Knight (1995)
 Tales from the Crypt: Bordello of Blood (1996)
 Tales from the Crypt Presents: Ritual (2002)

 Tank Girl (1995) (Deadline Publication)
 Teen Titans (DC Comics):
 Teen Titans: Trouble in Tokyo (2006, animated TV movie)
 Justice League vs. Teen Titans (2016, animated direct-to-video)
 Teen Titans: The Judas Contract (2017, animated direct-to-video)
 Teen Titans Go! To the Movies (2018, animated)
 Teen Titans Go! vs. Teen Titans (2019, animated direct-to-video crossover)
Teen Titans Go! See Space Jam (2021, animated TV crossover)
Teen Titans Go! & DC Super Hero Girls: Mayhem in the Multiverse (2022, animated direct-to-video crossover) 
 Teenage Mutant Ninja Turtles (Mirage Comics):
 Teenage Mutant Ninja Turtles (1990)
 Teenage Mutant Ninja Turtles II: The Secret of the Ooze (1991)
 Teenage Mutant Ninja Turtles III (1993)
 TMNT (2007, animated)
 Turtles Forever (2009, animated TV film)
 Teenage Mutant Ninja Turtles (2014, new franchise)
 Teenage Mutant Ninja Turtles: Out of the Shadows (2016)
 Term Life (2016) (Image Comics)
 Thor (Marvel Comics):
 Thor (2011)
 Thor: Tales of Asgard (2011, animated direct-to-video)
 A Funny Thing Happened on the Way to Thor's Hammer (2011, direct-to-video short film)
 Thor: The Dark World (2013)
Team Thor (2016, direct-to-video short film)
Team Thor: Part 2 (2017, direct-to-video short film)
 Thor: Ragnarok (2017)
Team Darryl (2018, direct-to-video short film)
Thor: Love and Thunder (2022)

 Timecop (Dark Horse Comics):
 Timecop (1994)
 Timecop 2: The Berlin Decision (2003, direct-to-video movie)

 Trailer Park of Terror (2008, direct-to-video, based on Imperium Comic)

 Turok: Son of Stone (2008, animated; direct-to-video) (Western Publishing)
 Two-Fisted Tales (1992, TV movie) (EC Comics)

U
 Ultra (2011, TV pilot) (Image Comics)

 Up in Flames (1973, unauthorized by creators) (Rip Off Press)

V
 V for Vendetta (2006, Vertigo Comics)

 Vampirella (1996, direct-to-video) (Warren Publishing)
 The Vault of Horror (1973) (EC Comics)
 Venom (Marvel Comics)
 Venom: Truth in Journalism (2013, short film)
 Venom (2018)
 Venom: Let There Be Carnage (2021)
 The Vigilante (1947, serial DC Comics)
 Virus (1999) (Dark Horse Comics)
Vixen: The Movie (2017, animated direct-to-video) (DC comics)

W
 The Walking Dead (Image Comics):
 The Robot Chicken Walking Dead Special: Look Who's Walking (2017, stop-motion TV special)
 Wanted (2008) (Top Cow Productions)
 Watchmen (DC comics):
 Watchmen (2009)
 Watchmen: The Director's Cut (2009)
 Watchmen: The Ultimate Cut (2009)
 Tales of the Black Freighter (2009, animated direct-to-video)
 Weird Science (1985) (EC Comics)
 When the Wind Blows (1986, animated) (British publication)

 Whiteout (2009) (Oni Press)
 Wilson (2017) (Drawn & Quarterly)
 Witchblade (2000, TV movie) (Top Cow Productions)

 Wolverine (Marvel Comics):
 X-Men Origins: Wolverine (2009)
 The Wolverine (2013)
 Logan (2017)
 Wonder Woman (DC comics):
 Wonder Woman (1974, TV movie)
 The New Original Wonder Woman (1975, TV movie)
 Wonder Woman (2009, animated direct-to-video)
 Wonder Woman (2011, unaired pilot)
 Wonder Woman (2017)
 Wonder Woman: Bloodlines (2019, animated direct-to-video)
 Wonder Woman 1984 (2020)

X

 X-Men (Marvel comics):
 X-Men: Pryde of the X-Men (1989, animated pilot)
 X-Men (2000)
 X2 (2003)
 X-Men: The Last Stand (2006)
 X-Men: First Class (2011)
 X-Men: Days of Future Past (2014)
 X-Men: Apocalypse (2016)
 Dark Phoenix (2019)

Z

Upcoming films
 2023
 Shazam! Fury of the Gods
 Batman: The Doom That Came to Gotham
 Guardians of the Galaxy Vol. 3
 Spider-Man: Across the Spider-Verse
 The Flash
 Teenage Mutant Ninja Turtles: Mutant Mayhem
 Blue Beetle
 Kraven the Hunter
 The Marvels
 Aquaman and the Lost Kingdom
 2024
 El Muerto
 Madame Web
 Spider-Man: Beyond the Spider-Verse
 Captain America: New World Order
 Thunderbolts
 Blade
 Joker: Folie à Deux
 Deadpool 3
 2025
 Fantastic Four
 Avengers: The Kang Dynasty
 Superman: Legacy
 The Batman Part II
 2026
 Avengers: Secret Wars

See also
 Superhero film
 List of American superhero films
 List of films based on French-language comics
 List of films based on manga
 List of comic-based films directed by women
 List of films based on Marvel Comics publications
 List of films based on DC Comics publications
 List of television series and films based on Dark Horse Comics publications
 List of television series and films based on Image Comics publications
 List of television series and films based on Harvey Comics publications
 List of television series and films based on Archie Comics publications

Also related:
 List of films based on comic strips
 List of films based on radio series
 List of films based on video games
 List of films based on toys
 List of television programs based on comics

Notes

References
 Superheroes Lives, List of films based on comics

English-language comics